(Glide, O sparkling waves and murmur softly), BWV 206, is a secular cantata composed by Johann Sebastian Bach in Leipzig and first performed on 7 October 1736.

History and text 
Bach composed this cantata for the birthday of Augustus III of Poland and Elector of Saxony. It was first performed in Leipzig, Saxony, on 7 October 1736. A second performance took place on 3 August 1740.

The librettist of the work is unknown, but was likely Picander. The cantata is counted among the works Bach wrote for celebrations of Leipzig University, Festmusiken zu Leipziger Universitätsfeiern.

Scoring and structure 
The cantata is also scored for four-part choir, three flutes, two oboes, two oboes d'amore, three trumpets, timpani, 1st and 2nd violins, violas, and basso continuo.

It has eleven movements:
Chorus: 
Recitative (bass): 
Aria (bass): 
Recitative (tenor): 
Aria (tenor): 
Recitative (alto): 
Aria (alto): 
Recitative (soprano): 
Aria (soprano): 
Recitative (SATB): 
Chorus:

Recordings 
Amsterdam Baroque Orchestra & Choir, Ton Koopman. J.S. Bach: Complete Cantatas Vol. 5. Erato, 1996.
Gächinger Kantorei Stuttgart / Bach-Collegium Stuttgart, Helmuth Rilling. Edition Bachakademie Vol. 64. Hänssler, 1994.
Kammerchor Stuttgart / Concerto Köln, Frieder Bernius. J.S. Bach Secular Cantatas BWV 206 & 207a. Sony Classical, 1990.
Ex Tempore Choir, Florian Heyerick / Musica Antiqua Köln, Reinhard Goebel BWV 36c, 201, 206, 207, Quodlibet BWV 524. Archiv Produktion  457 348-2, 1996 & 1997.

Notes

References

External links 
 Schleicht, spielende Wellen, BWV 206: performance by the Netherlands Bach Society (video and background information)
 
 BWV 206 – "Schleicht, spielende Wellen" English translation, Emmanuel Music
 Schleicht, spielende Wellen history, scoring, Bach website 
 BWV 206 Schleicht, spielende Wellen English translation, University of Vermont

Secular cantatas by Johann Sebastian Bach
1736 compositions